Peter Solan (born Peter Michael Anthony Solan; 1929 in Rinnaseer, Islandeady) was a Gaelic football corner forward who played for the Mayo county team and was involved in the county's All-Ireland Senior Football Championship (SFC) win over Louth in 1950, scoring the first goal in a match that Mayo won by two points.

Solan was again involved in the 1951 All-Ireland SFC-winning campaign, helping Mayo all the way to the final. In the Connacht final that year against Galway, he scored 3–1, going on then to score against Kerry in the semi-final. He was named as a sub for the final but did not appear in the team photo. Mayo has lost each All-Ireland Final it has appeared in since.

Peter Solan worked as a civil engineer, and was an accomplished traditional dancer and musician on several instruments as well as being fluent in the Irish language. He performed in Irish music events in Dublin, Nigeria and South Africa, where he married his wife Maureen in April 1959. The couple had five children who grew up in Ireland and South Africa.

Solan died in South Africa in January 1985 aged 55, after being diagnosed with cancer a few months earlier.

References

External links
 Peter the Greatest
 
 Mayo 1950 1951
 MayoGAA 1948
 MayoGAA 1950
 Hoganstand
 "The Final Curtain", John Cuffe

1929 births
1985 deaths
Gaelic football forwards
Irish civil engineers
Irish expatriates in South Africa
Mayo inter-county Gaelic footballers